USS SC-497 was a SC-497 class submarine chaser that served in the United States Navy and later the Free French Navy during World War II.  She was originally laid down as PC-497 on 29 November 1941 by the Westergard Boat Works in Rockport, Texas, and launched on 4 July 1941.  She was commissioned as USS PC-497 on 16 October 1942.  She was later reclassified as a SC-497 class submarine chaser and renamed SC-497.  She was transferred to the Free French Navy as part of the Lend-Lease program on 18 March 1944 as CH-96.  The transfer was made permanent on 15 August 1944.  She was renamed CH-724 in 1952 and later P-724 before being withdrawn from service on 23 October 1980.  Her exact fate is unknown.

See also
 Harbour Defence Motor Launch
 Wooden boats of World War II

References

Motor Gunboat/Patrol Gunboat Photo Archive: SC-497

SC-497-class submarine chasers
Ships built in Texas
1941 ships
Ships of the Free French Naval Forces
SC-497-class submarine chasers of the French Navy
Maritime incidents in April 1944